Bocchino is a surname. Notable people with the name include:

Giorgio Bocchino (1913–1995), Italian fencer
Italo Bocchino (born 1967), Italian politician and journalist
Riccardo Bocchino (born  1988), Italian rugby union player
Simone Bocchino (born 1978), Italian sound engineer, composer and producer

See also 
Bocchino-Dente Memorial Plaza, is a plaza in the Borough Park section of Brooklyn, New York